Sylvia Bourdon (born 1949 in Cologne, West Germany) is a French activist who speaks four languages and is an expert in French art and design.

Career

She acted in a number of adult movies in the 1970s. She was a famous gallerist from 1978–1985: La Galerie Sylvia Bourdon, 16 rue des Grands Augustins, Paris 6 
and BD 36 (restaurant exhibiting cartoons), 36, rue Grégoire de Tours Paris 6.

In 1985, she began an eleven-year effort to hold a contest for the European Community's most talented artists to design the then new European currency and have the entries judged in a 12-nation referendum. The "Graphic Ecu Competition" officially launched in April 1993 and, at one point, had twelve European central banks participating. After the contest ended in 1996, none of the contests' 97 banknotes and 44 coin designs were used for the new European currency. Bourdon later sued the European Union over its decision to call the single currency the Euro instead of the Ecu, the name inscribed in the Maastricht Treaty. Her operation is mentioned in a thesis published at MacMillans New York, by Oriane Calligaro: NEGOCIATING EUROPE.

Since 2008 she runs a company promoting French technological innovations in Saudi Arabia, India and Russia.

Books 

 L'Amour est une fête (1976). Love Is a Feast, trans. by Barbara Wright (Calder, 1977)

References

External links
 ITC
 NYT
SB
 Le témoignage de Sylvia Bourdon
 pme-francaises-a-conquerir-de-nouveaux-marches-a-l-international.N27202 USL
 trade-action-en-arabie-saoudite.html LTF
 

1949 births
Living people
French activists
French women activists
French pornographic film actresses
Eurofederalism